The 12th Luftwaffe Field Division (German: 12. Luftwaffen-Feld-Division) was a major military organization of the Wehrmacht during the Second World War. The Luftwaffe Field Division was formed  from Flieger-Regiment 12 at the end of 1942, and was assigned to Army Group North in early 1943.

After being decimated during the fighting in the area in the Courland Pocket, the division was moved by ship to Danzig, and employed there between Danzig and Zoppot until the beginning of May 1945, when it had been almost completely wiped out.

Known division members
 (1899-1944), was from 1933 to 1934 chief police officer of Nuremberg - Fürth and from 1939 to 1944 NSDAP member of the Reichstag.

Further reading

Peter Schmitz / Klaus -Jürgen Thies / Günter Wegmann / Christian Zweng: The German divisions 1941–1945, Bd. 3, Biblio Verlag, Osnabrück 1996. .

Notes

References

12
1942 establishments in Germany
1945 disestablishments in Germany
Military units and formations established in 1942
Military units and formations disestablished in 1945